The 1924 United States presidential election in Mississippi took place on November 4, 1924, as part of the 1924 United States presidential election, which was held throughout all contemporary forty-eight states. Voters chose ten representatives, or electors to the Electoral College, who voted for president and vice president.

Mississippi was won easily by John W. Davis of West Virginia over incumbent president Calvin Coolidge and Progressive nominee Robert M. La Follette of Wisconsin. With 89.3% of the popular vote, Mississippi was Davis' 2nd strongest state.

Results

References

Notes

Mississippi
1924
1924 Mississippi elections